The  Imperial Russian Navy operated as the navy of the Russian Tsardom and later the Russian Empire from 1696 to 1917. Formally established in 1696, it lasted until dissolved in the wake of the February Revolution of 1917. It developed from a smaller force that had existed prior to Tsar Peter the Great's founding of the modern Russian navy during the Second Azov campaign in 1696. It expanded in the second half of the 18th century and reached its peak strength by the early part of the 19th century, behind only the British and French fleets in terms of size.

The Imperial Navy drew its officers from the aristocracy of the Empire, who belonged to the state Russian Orthodox Church. Young aristocrats began to be trained for leadership at a national naval school. From 1818 on, only officers of the Imperial Russian Navy were appointed to the position of Chief Manager of the Russian-American Company, based in Russian America (present-day Alaska) for colonization and fur-trade development. Although the early Imperial Navy initially employed paid foreign sailors, the government began to recruit native-born sailors as conscripts, drafted (as were men to serve in the army). Service in the navy was lifelong. Many naval commanders and recruits came from Imperial Russia's non-Russian lands with maritime traditions—Finland and (especially) the Baltic governorates.

The Russian Navy went into a period of decline due to the Empire's slow technical and economic development in the first half of the 19th century. It had a revival in the latter part of the century during the reign of Emperor Nicholas II, but most of its Pacific Fleet (along with the Baltic Fleet sent to the Far East) was destroyed in the humiliating Russo-Japanese War of 1904-1905.

The navy had mixed experiences during the First World War, with the Germans generally gaining the upper hand in the Baltic Sea, while the Russians took control of the Black Sea. The Russian Revolution marked the end of the Imperial Navy; its officers had mostly aligned with the emperor, and the sailors split to fight on either side during the Russian Civil War of 1917-1922. The Soviet Navy, established as the Red Fleet in 1918 after the Revolution, took over the available surviving ships.

Strategically, the Imperial Russian Navy faced two over-arching issues: the use of ice-free ports and open access to the high seas. Saint Petersburg and the other Baltic ports, as well as Vladivostok, could not operate in winter, hence the push for Russia to establish naval facilities on the Black Sea coast and (eventually) at Murmansk. And even substantial naval forces in the Baltic Sea remained confined by the lack of free access to the Atlantic via the Øresund, just as the Black Sea Fleet could not always rely on passage through the Bosphorus and the Dardanelles. As a result, separate naval groupings developed in relative isolation in the Baltic, the Black Sea, the Russian Far East and the Arctic.

Background
Under Tsar Mikhail I (Mikhail Fyodorovich Romanov), the first three-masted ships built within Russia were finished in 1636. Danish shipbuilders from Holstein built it in Balakhna according to contemporary European design. The ship was christened Frederick; during its maiden voyage on the Caspian Sea, the ship sailed into a heavy storm and was lost at sea.

During the Russo-Swedish War, 1656-1658, Russian forces seized the Swedish fortresses of Dünaburg and Kokenhusen on the Western Dvina. They renamed the former as Borisoglebsk and the latter as Tsarevich-Dmitriyev. A boyar named Afanasy Ordin-Nashchokin founded a shipyard at Tsarevich-Dmitriev fortress and began constructing vessels to sail in the Baltic Sea. In 1661, however, Russia lost this and other captured territories by the Peace of Cardis. Russia agreed to surrender to Sweden all captured territories, and it ordered all vessels constructed at Tsarevich-Dmitriev to be destroyed.

Boyar Ordin-Nashchokin turned his attention to the Volga River and Caspian Sea. With the Tsar's approval, the boyar brought Dutch shipbuilding experts to the town of Dedinovo near the confluence of the Oka and Volga rivers. Shipbuilding commenced in the winter of 1667. Within two years, four vessels had been completed: one 22-gun galley, christened Орёл ("Oryol" = "Eagle"), and three smaller ships. Орёл was Russia's first own three-masted, European-designed sailing ship. It was captured in Astrakhan by rebellious Cossacks led by Stepan Razin. The Cossacks ransacked Орёл and abandoned it, half-submerged, in an estuary of the Volga.

During much of the 17th century, independent Russian merchants and Cossacks, using koch boats, sailed across the White Sea, exploring the rivers Lena, Kolyma and Indigirka, and founding settlements in the region of the upper Amur. The most celebrated Russian explorer was Semyon Dezhnev who, in 1648, sailed along the entire northern expanse of present-day Russia by way of the Arctic Ocean. Rounding the Chukotsk Peninsula, Dezhnev passed through the Bering Sea and sailed into the Pacific Ocean.

Reign of Peter the Great

Peter the Great established the modern Russian Navy. During the Second Azov campaign of 1696 against Turkey, the Russians for the first time used 2 warships, 4 fireships, 23 galleys and 1300 strugs, built on the Voronezh River. After the occupation of the Azov fortress, the Boyar Duma looked into Peter's report of this military campaign. It passed a decree on October 20, 1696, to commence construction of a navy. This date is considered the official founding of the Imperial Russian Navy.

During the Great Northern War of 1700–1721, the Russians built the Baltic Fleet. The construction of the oared fleet (galley fleet) took place in 1702–1704 at several shipyards (estuaries of the rivers Syas, Luga and Olonka). In order to defend the conquered coastline and attack enemy's maritime communications in the Baltic Sea, the Russians created a sailing fleet from ships built in Russia and others imported from abroad.

From 1703 to 1723, the main naval base of the Baltic Fleet was located in Saint Petersburg and then in Kronstadt. Bases were also created in Reval (Tallinn) and in Vyborg after it was ceded by Sweden after Russo-Swedish War (1741-1743). Vladimirsky Prikaz was the first organization in charge of shipbuilding. Later on, these functions were transferred to the Admiralteyskiy Prikaz (admiralty in St. Petersburg).

In 1745 the Russian Navy had 130 sailing vessels, including 36 ships of the line, 9 frigates, 3 shnyavas (шнява — a light two-mast ship used for reconnaissance and messenger services), 5 bombardier ships, and 77 auxiliary vessels. The ships were being constructed at 24 shipyards, including the ones in Voronezh, Kazan, Pereyaslavl, Arkhangelsk, Olonets, Petersburg and Astrakhan.

The naval officers came from dvoryane (noblemen, aristocrats who belonged to the state Russian Orthodox Church). The regular sailors were conscripts, drafted into military service. The service in the navy was lifelong. Children of noblemen were educated for naval service at the School for Mathematical and Navigational Sciences, which had been founded in 1701 in Moscow's Sukharev Tower. Students were often sent abroad for training in foreign fleets. The Navy also hired foreign nationals, with significant naval experience, to serve in the Russian Navy, such as the Norwegian-Dutch Cornelius Cruys, the Greek Ivan Botsis, or the Scotsman Thomas Gordon. In 1718, the Admiralty Board (Адмиралтейств-коллегия) was established as the highest naval authority in Russia.

The organizational principles of the Russian Navy, educational and training methods for preparing future staff, and methods for conducting military action were all summarized in the Naval Charter (1720), written by Peter I himself. Peter the Great, Feodor Apraksin, Alexey Senyavin, Naum Senyavin, Admiral Mikhail Golitsyn and others are generally credited for the development of the Russian art of naval warfare. The main principles of naval warfare were further developed by Grigory Spiridov, Feodor Ushakov, and Dmitry Senyavin.

Between 1688 and 1725, a period spanning most of Peter's reign, some 1,260 seagoing vessels were built in Russian shipyards for the Imperial Russian Navy. Fleets were launched successively on the White Sea, the Sea of Azov (with access to the Black Sea), the Baltic Sea, and the Caspian Sea (Russo-Persian War of 1722-1723). In 1700, the majority of sailors in the Imperial Russian Navy were foreigners at the start of the Great Northern War. But by 1721, at the end of the same war, the navy had 7,215 native-born sailors.

18th century
In the second half of the 18th century, the Russian Navy was built up to support the government's foreign policy. The nation conducted the Russo-Turkish wars for supremacy in the Black Sea. For the first time, Russia sent its squadrons from the Baltic Sea to distant theaters of operations (see Archipelago expeditions of the Russian Navy). Admiral Spiridov's squadron gained supremacy in the Aegean Sea by destroying the Turkish fleet in the Battle of Chesma in 1770. In 1771, the Russian army conquered the coasts of the Kerch Strait and fortresses of Kerch and Yenikale.

After having advanced to the Danube, the Russians formed the Danube Military Flotilla for the purpose of guarding the Danube estuary. In 1771 they were guests to the Republic of Ragusa. The Beluga caviar from the Danube was famous, and merchants from the Republic of Ragusa dominated the import-export business in Serbia with the Habsburg monarchy.

In 1773 the vessels of the Azov Flotilla (created anew in 1771) sailed into the Black Sea. Russia defeated Turkey in the Russo-Turkish War of 1768–1774, gaining control of the Sea of Azov and a part of the Black Sea coastline between the rivers Bug and Dniester. The Crimea was pronounced independent under Russia's protectorate and was annexed by Russia in 1783. In 1778, the Russians founded the port of Kherson. The first battleship of the Black Sea Fleet was commissioned here in 1783. A year later, a squadron had been developed.

19th century

By the second half of the 18th century, the Russian Navy had the fourth-largest fleet in the world after Great Britain, Spain and France. The Black Sea Fleet possessed 35 line-of-battle ships and 19 frigates (1787), and the Baltic Fleet had 23 ships of the line and 130 frigates (1788). In the early 19th century, the Russian Navy consisted of the Baltic and Black Sea Fleets, Caspian Flotilla, White Sea Flotilla and Okhotsk Flotilla.

During the Napoleonic Wars, the Russian Navy had limited sea-going capability, with the 1802 Committee to Improve the Condition of the Navy concluding that the dire state of the ships of the Baltic Fleet, suffering as they did from extensive rot and a lack of copper plating, was incapable of defending Kronstadt and St Petersburg. The Committee's chairman, Vorontsov, concluded that "It is impossible for Russia to be considered a major naval power, but there is no predictable need or advantage in this status." Consequently, the Committee recommended nothing more than limited measures to rectify the state of the fleets, and the Russians retained limited capability at sea thereafter, relying on their land power to defeat Napoleon. In 1802, the Ministry of Naval Military Forces was established (renamed to Naval Ministry in 1815).

This attitude changed with the accession of Nicholas I in 1825, who less than a month into his reign declared that "Russia must become the third naval power after England and France and must be more powerful than any coalition of secondary naval powers." As a consequence, the 1825 Committee to Organise the Fleet was formed, which outlined an ambitious shipbuilding project which aimed to create the third largest navy in Europe.

The growth of the Navy in the years after this greatly bolstered Russian naval capability, expanding both the Baltic and Black Sea Fleets. A Russian squadron under the Dutch Admiral Lodewijk van Heiden fought at the Battle of Navarino in 1827. The Navy was used to great effect during the subsequent Russo-Turkish War (1828-29), utilising the Mediterranean squadron and the Black Sea Fleet to gain command of the Sea from the Ottomans, which contributed to Russian victory and the signing of the Treaty of Adrianople in 1829.

In 1826 the Russians built their first armed steamboat Izhora, equipped with eight cannons. In 1836, they constructed the first paddle steam frigate of the Russian Navy called Bogatyr (displacement — , power — , armament — 28 cannons).

The Imperial Russian Navy sent out exploratory expeditions. Between 1803 and 1855, their ships undertook more than 40 circumnavigations and long-distant voyages, most of which were in support of their North Americans colonies in Russian America (Alaska) and Fort Ross in northern California, and their Pacific ports on the eastern seaboard of Siberia. These voyages produced important scientific research materials and discoveries in Pacific, Antarctic and Arctic theatres of operations.

In 1863, during the American Civil War, the Russian Navy's Atlantic and Pacific fleets wintered in the American ports of New York and San Francisco, respectively. Some historians credit this visit as a major factor in deterring France and the UK  from entering the war on the Confederate side. Delahaye states that besides supporting the Union, Russia was also preparing for a war with France and the UK should they intervene in the Polish insurrection of 1863. The Russian Navy was weak and could easily be blockaded in its home ports, but if it was in the US when the war started it could more easily attack British and French commerce.

The Imperial Russian Navy continued to expand in the later part of the century becoming the third largest fleet in the world after the UK and France. The expansion accelerated under Emperor Nicholas II who had been influenced by the American naval theoretician Alfred Thayer Mahan. Russian industry, although growing in capacity, was not able to meet the demands and some ships were ordered from the UK, France, Germany, USA, and Denmark. French naval architects in particular had a considerable influence on Russian designs.

Crimean War and aftermath

Russia's slow technical and economic development in the first half of the 19th century caused her to fall behind other European countries in the field of steamboat construction. By the outbreak of the Crimean War in 1853, Russia had the Baltic and Black Sea Fleets, Arkhangelsk Flotilla, Caspian Flotilla and Okhotsk Flotilla (altogether, 40 battleships, 15 frigates, 24 corvettes and brigs, 16 steam frigates etc.).

The combined number of staff of all the fleets equaled 91,000 people. Despite all this, the reactionary serfdom system had an adverse effect on the development of the Russian Navy. It was especially typical of the Baltic Fleet, which was known for its harsh military drill.

Thanks to admirals Mikhail Lazarev, Pavel Nakhimov, Vladimir Kornilov, and Vladimir Istomin, the sailors of the Black Sea Fleet were taught the art of warfare and upholding of military traditions of the Russian Navy, formed in the times of Admiral Ushakov.

The Battle of Sinop in 1853 the Black Sea Fleet under Nakhimov made a number of tactical innovations. During the Siege of Sevastopol in 1854–1855, the Russian sailors used all means possible to defend their base from land and sea. In accordance with the Treaty of Paris, Russia lost the right to have a military fleet in the Black Sea. In the 1860s, the Russian fleet which had relied upon sails lost its significance and was gradually replaced by steam.

After the Crimean War, Russia commenced construction of steam-powered ironclads, monitors, and floating batteries. These vessels had strong artillery and thick armor, but lacked seaworthiness, speed and long-distance abilities. In 1861, they built the first steel-armored gunboat Opyt (Опыт). In 1869, the Russians began the construction of one of the first seafaring ironclads,  (Пётр Великий).

Russo-Japanese War

On the night of 8 February 1904, the Japanese naval fleet under Admiral Heihachiro Togo opened the war with a surprise attack by torpedo boat destroyers on the Russian ships at Port Arthur, badly damaging two Russian battleships. The attacks developed into the Battle of Port Arthur the next morning. A series of indecisive naval engagements followed, in which the Japanese were unable to attack the Russian fleet successfully under shore batteries (coastal guns) of the harbor and the Russians declined to leave the harbor for the open seas, especially after the death of Admiral Stepan Osipovich Makarov on 13 April 1904.

After the attack on Port Arthur, the Japanese attempted to deny the Russians use of the port. On the night of 13/14 February, the Japanese attempted to block the entrance to Port Arthur by sinking several cement-filled steamers in the deep water channel to the port. But the steamers, driven off course by Russian gunfire were unable to sink them in the designated places, rendering them ineffective. Another attempt to block the harbor entrance on the night of 3/4 May with blockships also failed.

Mine-laying
In March, the energetic Vice Admiral Stepan Makarov (1849–1904) took command of the First Russian Pacific Squadron with the intention of making plans to break out of the Port Arthur blockade. By then, both sides began a policy of tactical offensive mine-laying by laying mines in each other's ports. This was the first time in warfare that mines were used for offensive purposes. In the past, mines were used as purely defensive purposes by keeping harbors safe from invading warships.

The Japanese mine-laying policy was effective at restricting the Russian movement of its ships outside Port Arthur when on 12 April 1904, two Russian battleships; the flagship, and  ran into a Japanese minefield off Port Arthur with both striking mines. Petropavlovsk sank within an hour, while Pobeda had to be towed back to Port Arthur for extensive repairs. Makarov died on Petropavlovsk.

However, the Russians soon learned the Japanese tactic of offensive minelaying and decided to play the strategy too. Hatsuse sank within minutes taking 450 sailors with her, while Yashima sank under tow a few hours later.

The Russian fleet attempted to break out from Port Arthur and proceed to Vladivostok, but they were intercepted and dispersed at the Battle of the Yellow Sea. The remnant of the Russian fleet remained in Port Arthur, where the ships were slowly sunk by the artillery of the besieging army. Attempts to relieve the city by land also failed, and after the Battle of Liaoyang in late August, the Russians retreated to Mukden (Shenyang). Port Arthur finally fell on 2 January 1905, after a series of brutal, high-casualty assaults.

Russian submarines
By 25 June, the Imperial Russian Navy had secretly purchased its first naval submarine, known as Madam, from Isaac Rice's Electric Boat Company. This submarine was originally built under the direction of Arthur Leopold Busch as the American torpedo boat Fulton. It was a prototype of the Holland Type 7 Design known as the Adder-class/ submarines. By 10 October, this first Russian submarine was officially commissioned into service and shipped to the eastern coast near Vladivostok Russia and was renamed Som ("Catfish"). This first Russian submarine was not ready in time for the Russo-Japanese War. The reason behind this delay was partly due to a late shipment of torpedoes that was originally ordered from Germany in early 1905. Russia soon ordered more submarines of the same basic design, and they were built under contract with the Holland Company by the Neva Shipbuilding Company located in St. Petersburg, Russia.

In 1903, the German ship building firm Germaniawerft at Kiel completed Germany's first fully functioning engine powered submarine; Forelle. The submarine was toured inspected by Kaiser Wilhelm II, and Prince Heinrich of Prussia was given a brief cruise in the vessel. These vessels, as well as Forelle were transported along the Trans-Siberian Railway en route to the war zone.

Germaniawerft, under the supervision of Spanish naval architect Raymondo Lorenzo d'Euevilley-Montjustin, continued his work on the Karp-class submarines, improving and modifying one into Germany's first U-boat, which was commissioned into the Imperial German Navy on 14 December 1906.  U-1 was retired in 1919, and is currently on display at the Deutsches Museum in Munich.

Due to the ongoing blockade of Port Arthur in 1904, the Imperial Russian Navy dispatched their remaining submarines to Vladivostok, and by the end of 1904 the last of seven subs had reached their new base there.  Using the seven boats as a foundation, the Imperial Russian Navy created the world's first operational submarine fleet at Vladivostok on 1 January 1905. On 14 February 1905 the new submarine fleet sent out its first combat patrol consisting of the vessels Som and Delfin.  With patrols varying from 24 hours to a few days, the sub fleets first enemy contact occurred on 29 April 1905 when Imperial Japanese Navy torpedo boats fired upon Som, withdrawing after failing to score a hit.  On 1 July the Russian submarine Keta made contact with two Japanese torpedo boats in the Tartar Strait.  Keta could not submerge quick enough to obtain a firing position and both adversaries broke contact.

Battle of Tsushima
On 21 October 1904, while passing by the United Kingdom (an ally of Japan but neutral in this war), they nearly provoked a war in the Dogger Bank incident by firing on British fishing boats that they mistook for Japanese torpedo boats.

The duration of the Baltic Fleet's journey meant that Admiral Togo was well aware of the Baltic Fleet's progress, and he made plans to meet it before it could reach port at Vladivostok. He intercepted them in the Tsushima Strait between Korea and Japan, in the early morning of 27 May 1905. Although both battleship fleets were on nearly equal footing in regards to the latest in battleship technology, with the British warship designs representing the Imperial Japanese Navy, and predominately the French designs being favored by the Russian fleets; it was the combat experience that Togo had accrued in the 1904 naval battles of Port Arthur and the Yellow Sea, that gave him the edge over the un-tested Admiral Rozhestvensky during the Battle of Tsushima on 27 May. By the end of the day on 27 May, nearly all of Rozhestvensky's battleships were sunk, including his flagship, ; and on the following day, Admiral Nebogatov, who had relieved Rozhestvensky due to his wounds, surrendered the remainder of the fleet to Admiral Togo.

Reconstruction prior to World War I
At the end of the Russo-Japanese War in 1905, Russia fell from being the third greatest naval power to sixth place. The focus of Russian naval activities shifted back from the Far East to the Baltic. The task of the Baltic Fleet was to defend the Baltic Sea and Saint Petersburg from the German Empire.

Tsar Nicholas II created a Naval General Staff in 1906. At first, attention was directed to creation of mine-laying and a submarine fleet. An ambitious expansion program was put before the Duma in 1907-1908 but was voted down. The Bosnian Crisis of 1909 forced a strategic reconsideration, and new s, cruisers, and destroyers were ordered for the Baltic Fleet. A worsening of relations with Turkey meant that new ships including the s were also ordered for the Black Sea Fleet. The total Russian naval expenditure from 1906 to 1913 was $519 million, in fifth place behind Britain, Germany, the United States and France.

The re-armament program included a significant element of foreign participation with several ships (including the cruiser Rurik) and machinery ordered from foreign firms. After the outbreak of World War I, ships and equipment being built in Germany were confiscated. Equipment from Britain was slow in reaching Russia or was diverted to the Western Allies' own war effort.

World War I

By 1917 the Imperial Navy had amassed a fleet of 55 submarines, used to varying degrees of success.

Baltic Sea

In the Baltic Sea, Germany and Russia were the main combatants, with a number of British submarines sailing through the Kattegat to assist the Russians, including  commanded by Max Horton. With the German fleet larger and more modern (many High Seas Fleet ships could easily be deployed to the Baltic via the Kiel Canal when the North Sea was quiet), the Russians played a mainly defensive role, at most attacking convoys between Germany and Sweden and laying offensive minefields. Russian and British submarines attacked German shipping sailing between Sweden and Germany.

With heavy defensive and offensive mining on both sides, fleets played a limited role on the Eastern Front. The Germans mounted major naval attacks on the Gulf of Riga, unsuccessfully in August 1915 and successfully in October 1917, when they occupied the islands in the Gulf (Operation Albion) and damaged Russian ships departing from Riga (Battle of Moon Sound), which had recently been captured by Germany.

By March 1918, the Russian Revolution and the Treaty of Brest-Litovsk made the Germans masters of the Baltic sea and German fleets transferred troops to support newly independent Finland and to occupy much of Russia, halting only when defeated in the West. The Russians evacuated the Baltic fleet from Helsinki and Reval to Kronstadt during the Ice Cruise of the Baltic Fleet in March 1918.

Black Sea

The Black Sea was the domain of both the Russian and Ottoman Empires but the Russian fleet dominated the sea. It possessed a large fleet based in Sevastopol and it was led by two skilled commanders: Admiral Eberhart and Admiral Kolchak (who took over in 1916).

The war in the Black Sea started when the Ottoman fleet bombarded several Russian cities in October 1914. The most advanced ships in the Ottoman fleet consisted of just two German ships: the battlecruiser  and light cruiser , both under the command of Admiral Wilhelm Souchon. Goeben was damaged on at least four occasions and was usually chased back to port by the superior Russian Navy. By the end of 1915, the Russian fleet had nearly complete control of the sea.

The Black Sea fleet was used mainly to support General Yudenich in his Caucasus Campaign. For example, in August 1915, a Russian submarine and two Russian destroyers attacked a Turkish convoy of four transports escorted by a cruiser and two destroyers. The Russian ships sank all four transports without losing a ship. Later, during the summer of 1916, the Ottoman army, under, Vehip Pasha, was ordered to re-take Trebizond. The Ottoman forces tried to march along the coast in June but the Russian fleet was able to reduce the speed of their advance to a crawl using naval bombardment to harass marching troops and destroy their supply columns. Eventually the Ottoman army gave up and withdrew.

After Admiral Kolchak took command (August 1916), the Russian fleet mined the exit from the Bosporus, preventing nearly all Ottoman ships from entering the Black Sea. Later that year, the naval approaches to Varna were also mined. The greatest loss suffered by the Russian Black Sea fleet was the destruction of the modern dreadnought , which blew up in port on 7 October 1916, just one year after it was commissioned. The sinking of Imperatritsa Mariya was never fully explained; it could have been sabotage or an accident.

Revolution and Civil War

The Revolution and subsequent civil war devastated the Russian Navy. Only the Baltic fleet based at Petrograd remained largely intact, although it was attacked by the British Royal Navy in 1919. Foreign Interventionists occupied the Pacific, Black Sea and Arctic coasts. Most of the surviving Black Sea Fleet warships, with crews loyal to the White Russian movement, became part of Wrangel's fleet under the control of  commander Pyotr Nikolayevich Wrangel and after evacuating White forces and civilians from the Crimea were eventually interned in Bizerta, Tunisia. Russian sailors fought on both sides in the conflict. The sailors of the Baltic fleet rebelled against harsh treatment by the Soviet authorities in the Kronstadt rebellion of 1921.

The surviving ships formed the core of the Soviet Navy on its 1918 establishment, though the remnants of Wrangel's fleet never returned to Russia.

Ranks of the Imperial Navy (English translation)

Beginning in the second half of the 19th century, ranks of the IRN were divided according to speciality and branch.

Deck ranks and rates 
Seamen and NCO's
 Seaman
 First Seaman
 Quartermaster Seaman
 Petty Officer 3rd Class (Boatswain's mate, Third mate, Skipper's mate, Stuurman's mate)
 Petty Officer 2nd Class (Boatswain, Second mate, Schooner skipper)
 Petty Officer 1st Class (Unteroffizier) (Constable)
 Chief Petty Officer (Skipper)
 Senior Chief Petty Officer (Senior Unteroffizier) (Chief mate, Conductor)
 Fleet Chief Petty Officer (Senior Boatswain)

Officers
 Brevet Midshipman/Garde-Marine (1827-1884)
 Midshipman
 Ship Secretary (until 1834), Sub-lieutenant (1834–84)
 Lieutenant (formerly Second Lieutenant 1724-1884)
 First Lieutenant (from 1907 onward)
 Captain Lieutenant (formerly Captain 3rd Rank until 1730, abolished 1909)
 Captain 2nd Rank
 Captain 1st Rank
 Captain-Commodore (until 1764 and 1798 to 1826, from 1764 to 1798 "Captain-Brigadier")
 Counter Admiral, Rear Admiral
 Vice Admiral
 Admiral
 General Admiral

Naval Infantry and ground service troops ranks 
Ranks of these troops mirrored those of the Imperial Russian Army from Private to General, and were distinguished from those in the army.

Marine enlisted and NCOs
 Marine Private, Marine
 Marine Gefreiter
 Marine Junior Unteroffizier (formerly Marine Corporal)
 Marine Senior Unteroffizier
 Marine Feldwebel (formerly Marine Sergeant)
 Marine Junior Ensign
 Marine Acting Ensign (from 1884 onward)

Marine officers
 Admiralty Ensign
 Admiralty Sub-lieutenant
 Admiralty Lieutenant
 Admiralty Captain Lieutenant (1907–13)
 Admiralty Staff Captain
 Admiralty Captain
 Admiralty Second Major (1780-1829)
 Admiralty First Major (1780-1829)
 Admiralty Major (1830-1884)
 Admiralty Lieutenant Colonel
 Admiralty Colonel
 Admiralty Brigadier (until 1830)
 Fleet Major General
 Fleet Lieutenant General
 Fleet General

Ranks of the Naval Artillery 
Marine enlisted and NCOs
 Marine Private, Marine
 Marine Gefreiter
 Marine Junior Gunner (formerly Marine Corporal)
 Marine Senior Gunner
 Marine Feldwebel (formerly Marine Sergeant)
 Marine Junior Ensign
 Marine Acting Ensign (from 1884 onward)

Officers
 Ensign
 Sub-lieutenant
 Lieutenant
 Captain Lieutenant (1907–13)
 Staff Captain
 Captain
 Second Major (1780-1829)
 First Major (1780-1829)
 Major (1830-1884)
 Lieutenant Colonel
 Colonel
 Brigadier (until 1830)
 Marine Artillery Major General
 Marine Artillery Lieutenant General
 General of Marine Artillery

Engineering ranks 

Until 1905 the Naval Mechanical Engineers Corps and the Fleet Engineers Corps had unique ranks. Both changed to ground-based ranks that year and in 1912 the former changed its ranks again to naval based ranks.

Rank insignia 1911-1917

See for a more detailed history, ranks and rank insignia

Unlike other navies of its time, the Imperial Russian Navy sported only shoulder rank insignia for officers and ratings.

See also
 Heads of Imperial Russian Navy
 List of Russian admirals
 List of Russian battleships
 List of Russian cruisers
 List of Russian destroyers
 List of Russian sail frigates
 List of ironclads of Russia
 List of Russian ships of the line
 List of Russian steam frigates
 Russian Hydrographic Service

References

Sources
 Beskrovny, L. G. The Russian Army and Fleet in the Nineteenth Century. (1996). Gulf Breeze.
 Boyevaya letopis' russkogo flota. Khronika vazhneishikh sobytii voyennoi istorii russkogo flota s IX veka po 1917 god. - Voyenizdat, Moskva, 1948. (Combat Annales of the Russian Navy. Chronicle of the Most Important Events of the Russian Navy History from the 9th century up to 1917)
 Corbett, Julian, Sir. Maritime Operations in the Russo-Japanese War 1904-1905. (1994). 
 
 Forczyk, Robert. Russian Battleship vs Japanese Battleship, Yellow Sea 1904-05. (2009) Osprey. .
 Grant, R. Captain. Before Port Arthur in a Destroyer; The Personal Diary of a Japanese Naval Officer. London, John Murray; first and second editions published in 1907.
 Lebedev A.A. To march and battle ready? The combat capabilities of naval squadrons Russian sailing fleet XVIII - mid XIX centuries. from the point of view of the status of their personnel. SPb, 2015. 
 Olender, Piotr. Russo-Japanese Naval War 1904-1905, Vol. 2, Battle of Tsushima. (2010); Published by Stratus s.c., Sandomierz, Poland.  .
 Pleshakov, Constantine. The Tsar's Last Armada: The Epic Voyage to the Battle of Tsushima.  (2002). 
 Semenov, Vladimir, Capt. The Battle of Tsushima. Originally published in 1907. (1912) E. P. Dutton & CO.
 Showell, Jak M. The U-Boat Century; German Submarine Warfare 1906-2006. (2006); Chatham Publishing, Great Britain. .
 Russian Warships in the Age of Sail, 1696-1860: Design, Construction, Careers and Fates. John Tredrea and Eduard Sozaev. Seaforth Publishing, 2010. .

Further reading

  Elagin Sergei Ivanovich. (1864) History of the Russian fleet. Period of Azov (История русского флота. Период Азовский) DjVu and PDF formats at Runivers.ru
  Viskovatov A. A brief historical overview of sea voyages of Russian and shipping them at all until the outcome of the 17th century (1864) DjVu format at Runivers.ru
  Veselago Theodosius F. List of Russian warships from 1668 to 1869 (1872) DjVu and PDF formats at Runivers.ru
  Veselago Theodosius F. Essays on Russian naval history (1875) DjVu and PDF formats at Runivers.ru
  Veselago Theodosius F. Brief information about the Russian naval battles in two centuries from 1656 to 1856 (1871) DjVu and PDF formats at Runivers.ru
  Belavenets Peter Ivanovich. Do We Need a fleet and its significance in the history of Russia (1910). DjVu format at Runivers.ru
  Arens, Evgeniy. Russian Navy (1904). DjVu and PDF formats at Runivers.ru

External links
 Russian Submarine forces history
 History of the Russian Navy 
 Web site focusing on submarine history and the works of Irish-American inventor, John Philip Holland and his company which was known as The Holland Torpedo Boat Company. See Fulton and look under Russian submarines (Som Class) Type 7-P.
 Russian submarine history can be located on this site.

 
Navy
Military units and formations established in 1696
1696 establishments in Russia